The R483 road is a regional road in Ireland which links the N67 road with Kilrush in County Clare. The road pases through a number of villages, including Creegh, and Cooraclare.

See also 

 Roads in Ireland
 National primary road
 National secondary road

References 

Regional roads in the Republic of Ireland

Roads in County Clare